Blood-group-substance endo-1,4-beta-galactosidase (endo-beta-galactosidase, blood-group-substance 1,4-beta-D-galactanohydrolase) is an enzyme with systematic name blood-group-substance 4-beta-D-galactanohydrolase. This enzyme catalyses the following chemical reaction

 Endohydrolysis of (1->4)-beta-D-galactosidic linkages in blood group A and B substances

Hydrolyses the 1,4-beta-D-galactosyl linkages adjacent to a 1,3-alpha-D-galactosyl or N-acetylgalactosaminyl residues and a 1,2-alpha-D-fucosyl residue.

References

External links 
 

EC 3.2.1